This list of universities and colleges in Puerto Rico includes colleges and universities in Puerto Rico that grant bachelor's degrees and/or post-graduate master's and doctorate degrees. The list does not include community colleges (alternatively called junior colleges) that grant two-year associate's degrees.

List of colleges

 American University of Puerto Rico
 Ana G. Méndez University System
 Metropolitan University
 Eastern University
 Turabo University
 Antillean Adventist University
 Atlantic University College
 Bayamon Central University
 Biblical and Pentecostal College of Puerto Rico
 Caribbean University
 Caribbean University at Bayamon
 Caribbean University at Carolina
 Caribbean University at Ponce
 Caribbean University at Vega Baja
 Carlos Albizu University, San Juan Campus
 Center for Advanced Studies on Puerto Rico and the Caribbean
 Central University of the Caribbean
 Conservatory of Music of Puerto Rico
 Evangelical Seminary of Puerto Rico
 Interamerican University of Puerto Rico
 Interamerican University of Puerto Rico at Aguadilla
 Interamerican University of Puerto Rico at Arecibo
 Interamerican University of Puerto Rico at Barranquitas
 Interamerican University of Puerto Rico at Bayamón
 Interamerican University of Puerto Rico at Fajardo
 Interamerican University of Puerto Rico at Guayama
 Interamerican University of Puerto Rico at Ponce
 Interamerican University of Puerto Rico at San Germán
 Interamerican University of Puerto Rico, Metropolitan Campus
 Interamerican University of Puerto Rico, School of Aviation
 Interamerican University of Puerto Rico School of Law
 Interamerican University of Puerto Rico, School of Optometry
 Mizpa Pentecostal University
 National University College
 Polytechnic University of Puerto Rico
 Ponce Health Sciences University
 Pontifical Catholic University of Puerto Rico
Pontifical Catholic University of Puerto Rico at Mayagüez
Pontifical Catholic University of Puerto Rico School of Architecture
Pontifical Catholic University of Puerto Rico School of Law
 San Juan Bautista School of Medicine
 Escuela de Artes Plásticas y Diseño de Puerto Rico
 University of Puerto Rico System
 University of Puerto Rico at Aguadilla
 University of Puerto Rico at Arecibo
 University of Puerto Rico at Bayamón
 University of Puerto Rico at Carolina
 University of Puerto Rico at Cayey
 University of Puerto Rico at Humacao
 University of Puerto Rico at Mayagüez
 University of Puerto Rico at Ponce
 University of Puerto Rico at Rio Piedras
 University of Puerto Rico at Utuado
 University of Puerto Rico, Medical Sciences Campus
 University of the Sacred Heart

See also

 List of college athletic programs in Puerto Rico
 List of universities and colleges in Ponce, Puerto Rico

External links
 Department of Education listing of accredited institutions in Puerto Rico

Puerto Rico
Colleges and universities in Puerto Rico
Puerto Rico